Kenji Ozawa (小沢 健二, Ozawa Kenji) is a Japanese musician born on April 14, 1968 in Sagamihara, Kanagawa. His uncle Seiji Ozawa is a noted conductor. Ozawa's first claim to fame was as a member of the pop duo Flipper's Guitar. 
He graduated from Tokyo University. His father is a professor.

Discography

Singles 
"Tenki yomi" (The weather reading) (1993)
"Kurayami kara te wo nobase" (Reach out of the darkness) (1993)
"Konya wa boogie back" (Boogie back) (1994)
"Aishi aisarete ikirunosa/Tokyo renai senka;mata wa koi wa ittemirya body blow" (Love is what we need/Love is like a body blow) (1994)
"Lovely" (1994)
"Corolla II ni notte" (1995)
"Tsuyoi kimochi tsuyoi ai/Sore wa chotto" (Tokyo love affair/I'm afraid not) (1995)
"Door wo knock suru no wa dare da?" (Who's gonna knock the door?) (1995)
"Senjo no boy's life" (Boy's life part2:love is a message) (1995)
"Sayonara nante ienai yo" (Never can say goodbye)(1995)
"Tsukai ukiuki dori" (1995)
"Bokura ga tabi ni deru riyu" (Single edit.) (Letters, Lights, travels on the streets) (1996)
"Otona ni nareba" (1996)
"Yumega yume nara" (If the dream is a dream) (1996)
"Buddy/Koishikute" (1997)
"Yubi saemo/Dice wo korogase" (Even the finger also/Roll over the dice) (1997)
"Aru hikari" (A certain light) (1997)
"Haru ni shite kimi wo omou" (1998)

Albums 
Inu wa hoeru ga caravan wa susumu(The dogs bark, but the caravan moves on) (1993), re-released as "Dogs" in 1997
LIFE (1994)
Kyutai no kanaderu ongaku (1996)
Eclectic (2002)
Setsuna (2003) (Compilation album)
Ecology of Everyday Life (2006)
Warera, Toki（2010）
So Kakkoii Uchuu (2019)

References
  http://nippop.com/artists/Kenji_Ozawa/
  http://www.tokyograph.com/news/id-6232

Japanese male musicians
Japanese musicians
1968 births
Living people
Shibuya-kei musicians
University of Tokyo alumni
People from Sagamihara
Musicians from Kanagawa Prefecture